Apotheker is a surname. Notable people with the name include:

David Apotheker (1855–1911), Lithuanian-born writer
Haijo Apotheker (born 1950), Dutch politician
Léo Apotheker (born 1953), German business executive

See also
Aptheker